

1972

See also 
 1972 in Australia

References

External links 
 Australian film at the Internet Movie Database

1972
Australia
Films